Donskoye is an urban locality (an urban-type settlement) in Svetlogorsky District of Kaliningrad Oblast, Russia. Population:

References 

Urban-type settlements in Kaliningrad Oblast
Svetlogorsky District